Frederick Leroy Robinson Jr. (born September 2, 1930) was a Canadian football player who played for the Toronto Argonauts, Hamilton Tiger-Cats, Ottawa Rough Riders and BC Lions. He won the Grey Cup with Ottawa in 1960. He played college football at the University of Washington and was drafted in the 1955 NFL draft by the Cleveland Browns (Round 14, #169). He played with Cleveland briefly in 1957.

References

1930 births
Ottawa Rough Riders players
Living people
University of Washington alumni
Cleveland Browns players
BC Lions players
Toronto Argonauts players
Hamilton Tiger-Cats players
Players of American football from Connecticut